Luke Eberl (born March 29, 1986) is an American actor and director best known for his role as Birn in the 2001 film Planet of the Apes and for his film Choose Connor. In 2008, Eberl was described by MovieMaker Magazine as one of the "10 Young Americans to Watch". He is currently in production on his second feature film, You Above All.

Directing career
Eberl began his filmmaking career in 1997 after his first film acting job at the age of 10, making documentaries for the local TV station winning a variety of awards. He then wrote and directed Incest which won the Audience Choice Award at the international First Look Student Film Festival, and stars Erick Avari, Hallee Hirsh, and John Patrick Amedori. Eberl subsequently directed several short films which played at film festivals all over the world.

In 2008 his directorial feature film debut, the political drama Choose Connor, starring Steven Weber, Alex Linz, Escher Holloway, John Rubinstein, April Grace, and Richard Riehle, toured to film festivals worldwide including CineVegas, Woodstock Film Festival, Rome International Film Festival, Method Fest, Newport Beach Film Festival, Omaha Film Festival, Seattle International Film Festival, NewFilmmakers NY and LA, as well as the Philadelphia International Film Festival, where Choose Connor won the Jury Prize for Best American Independent. It was then released theatrically and on DVD by Strand Releasing to rave reviews from major publications including The New York Times, Los Angeles Times, Washington Post, and Variety.

Eberl was named by MovieMaker Magazine one of the "10 Young Americans to Watch".

In 2011, Eberl co-directed with Tommy Snider the "Together Again" music video for the Grammy nominated band Shiny Toy Guns, and co-directed with Edgar Morais the music videos for Shiny Toy Guns' subsequent singles "Waiting Alone" and "Fading Listening".

Eberl filmed Fault Line, a feature film set in Los Angeles, in secret with a cast that includes Kris Lemche, Caitlyn Folley, Dov Tiefenbach, Jon Foster, Michael Welch, Edgar Morais, Chris Marquette, Zoë Kravitz, Leah Pipes, Lou Taylor Pucci and Angela Sarafyan. The film is described as being a period piece taking place in 2009 that revolves around the lives of a group of young adults struggling with the consequences of a rapidly changing world during the turn of the decade. The film is expected to be released in 2023.

On June 25th 2021, We Won't Forget, the short film directed by Lucas Elliot Eberl and Edgar Morais made its world premiere in competition at Palm Springs International ShortFest. The film was co-written by the directors and Whitney Able, who stars in the film as a woman whose frustrations boil to the surface while hosting a party for her friends, culminating in a public freakout that turns into collective hysteria. Edgar Morais also stars in the film alongside John Patrick Amedori, Paul James, Davida Williams and Caitlyn Folley, among others. The film screened in competition at the Hamptons International Film Festival, Tirana International Film Festival, Woodstock Film Festival, Rooftop Films and IndieLisboa International Film Festival, among others. We Won't Forget won the Grand Jury Prize, as well as the award for Best Editing at Castrovillari Film Festival and the jury's Honorable Mention at FEST New Directors New Films Festival.

Eberl is currently in production on the multi-year spanning feature film You Above All,  co-directing with Edgar Morais and starring Edgar Morais, Olivia Thirlby, Steven Weber, Rita Blanco Richard Riehle, Kris Lemche and Pia Mechler. The USA/Portugal co-production is expected to be released in 2023.

Acting career
Eberl's long list of film acting credits include a lead role in Tim Burton's Planet of the Apes, with Mark Wahlberg, Tim Roth, Helena Bonham Carter; Phantoms, with Ben Affleck and Peter O'Toole; and Lost In the Pershing Point Hotel, with John Ritter; A Painted House based on John Grisham's novel, with Logan Lerman, Scott Glenn, Robert Sean Leonard, and Melinda Dillon, directed by Alfonso Arau; and in Clint Eastwood's Letters from Iwo Jima with Ken Watanabe; Larry Clark's Marfa Girl 2; Miguel Nunes' You See the Moon, Final Recourse with Chaz Palminteri and Teri Polo and the cult teen comedy Getting that Girl. He won the award for Best Actor in a Short Film at the prestigious Method Fest for his performance in Aaron Himelstein's Sugar Mountain. Luke has also had guest starring roles on many television series including Cold Case, Judging Amy, Boston Public, Touched by an Angel, ER, and Big Love as well as a recurring role as Daniel Gibson on the Netflix series Daredevil.
Eberl can be next seen in Victoria Mahoney's Chalk, Marcela Jacobina's Nobody with Carloto Cotta and Rodrigo Areias' The Worst Man in London.

Work in Canadian arctic
Eberl visited Canada's arctic where he worked with schoolchildren in the town of Inuvik, Northwest Territories. On occasion he taught a video production class at Samuel Hearne Secondary School and even coached two students to the Territorial Skills Competition held in Yellowknife, Northwest Territories. He added to the popularity of filmmaking in the north and encouraged the youth to continue to produce short films.

Acting filmography

Directing filmography

References

External links

The Movie IMDb page

1986 births
Living people
American film directors
American male film actors
Male actors from Colorado